South Valley is the name of several places in the United States:

South Valley, Santa Clara County in California
South Valley, Bernalillo County in New Mexico
South Valley, Cattaraugus County in New York
South Valley Stream, New York, Nassau County in New York
South Valley Township, Rolette County in North Dakota